The Free Patriotic Movement is a Lebanese political party. Founded by Michel Aoun in 2005, the party is currently led by Aoun's son-in-law Gebran Bassil since 2015.

Ideology
The Free Patriotic movement follows Lebanese nationalism and follows the agenda of Gen. Michel Aoun.

FPM is anti-refugee, pro-civil state.

Aoun return from exile
For many years, while Aoun was and exiled in Paris and on 14 July 1994, he established the Free Patriotic Movement in what he called "The National Conference". He returned to Lebanon on 7 May 2005 after the Cedar Revolution forced the withdrawal of the Syrian forces, and then contested the legislative elections held in late May in early June although it placed him on the head of the largest Christian group of deputies.

Aoun also contested the Cedar Revolution which itself gave him the opportunity to come back to Lebanon.

History

2006 
In 2006, the FPM signed a memorandum of understanding with Hezbollah organizing their relation and discussing Hezbollah's disarmament, given some conditions. The second and third conditions for disarmament were the return of Lebanese prisoners from Israeli jails and the elaboration of a defense strategy to protect Lebanon from the Israeli threat. The agreement also discussed the importance of having normal diplomatic relations with Syria and the request for information about the Lebanese political prisoners in Syria and the return of all political prisoners and diaspora in Israel.

On 1 December 2006, Free Patriotic Movement leader Michel Aoun declared to a crowd of protesters that the current government of Lebanon was unconstitutional, claiming that the government  had "made corruption a daily affair" and called for the resignation of the government. Hundred of thousands of supporters of this party, Amal Movement, and Hezbollah, according to the Internal Security Forces (ISF), gathered at Downtown Beirut trying to force Fouad Siniora to resign.

2007 - 2010 
On 11 July 2008, FPM members, Issam Abu Jamra as deputy-prime minister, Gebran Bassil as minister of telecommunications, and Mario Aoun as minister of social affairs were appointed to the cabinet. It was the Movement's first participation in the Lebanese Government.

Despite the strong media and political war against the Free Patriotic Movement, the results of the 2009 Elections granted the FPM 27 parliamentary seats. The FPM's bloc is the second largest in the Lebanese parliament. The FPM gained 7 more seats than in  the 2005 elections, earning at least triple the number of deputies of any other Christian-based bloc in the parliament due to geographical distribution. The total seats won by the March 8 alliance were 57 out of 128, which led to a defeat for the FPM.

In November 2009, the Free Patriotic Movement nominated five ministers to join the first government headed by Saad Hariri.  The five ministers included:

Gebran Bassil as Minister of Energy and Water
Charbel Nahas as Minister of Telecommunications
Youssef Saade as Minister of State
Abraham Dadayan as Minister of Industry
Fadi Abboud as Minister of Tourism

2010s 
In June 2011, the Change and Reform bloc led by Aoun nominated eleven ministers to join the second government headed by Najib Mikati, gaining more than double the share they had in the former government. The eleven ministers were:

Ministers with portfolios:
Shakib Qortbawi as Minister of Justice
Fayez Ghosn as Minister of Defense
Gebran Bassil as Minister of Energy
Nicolas Sehnaoui as Minister of Telecommunications
Vrej Sabounjian as Minister of Industry
Fadi Aboud as Minister of Tourism
Charbel Nahas as Minister of Labour ( as pro-FPM)
Gaby Layoun as Minister of Culture
Marwan Charbel as Minister of Interior and Municipalities (merge power between Aoun and Michel Suleiman)

Ministers without portfolios:
Salim Karam
Panos Manjian

2014 government formation 
In February 2014, the Change and Reform bloc led by Michel Aoun nominated four ministers to join the national unity government headed by Prime Minister Tammam Salam. The Free Patriotic Movement had two ministers:

Gebran Bassil as Minister of Foreign and Expatriates (Free Patriotic Movement)
Elias Bou Saab as Minister of Education (Free Patriotic Movement)
Arthur Nazarian as Minister of Energy (Tashnag Party)
Ronnie Arayji as Minister of Culture (Marada Movement)

Gebran Bassil's appointment as leader 
On 17 August 2015, Minister Gebran Bassil was chosen by General Michel Aoun as the new leader for the Free Patriotic Movement. No elections were done because it could have possibly led to fracturing the party, and so Alain Aoun stepped down from candidacy in order for Bassil to be assigned as the new leader. On February 28, the party elected his political bureau members:
 Mireille Aoun
 Naji Hayek
 Jimmy Jabbour
 Rindala Jabbour
 Naaman Mrad
 Ziad Najjar

Election of Michel Aoun as Lebanese President 

Lebanese Forces (LF) leader Samir Geagea and Free Patriotic Movement (FPM) Founder MP Michel Aoun turned a historic page in intra-Christian relations when the former March 14 presidential nominee officially endorsed on Monday Aoun's candidacy for the presidency. "I announce after long consideration, discussions and deliberations between members of the executive body of the Lebanese Forces, our endorsement of the candidacy of [former] General Michel Aoun for the presidency," Geagea said in joint news conference with his March 8 rival. Speaking from the LF's headquarters in Maarab where he had met with Aoun shortly before the news conference, Geagea read a 10-point understanding that summarized the key points of the Declaration of Intent struck between the LF and FPM in June.

The commitment to the implementation of the Taif Accord, the need to stop the flow of arms and militants across the Lebanese-Syrian border in both directions, the ratification of a new electoral law and compliance with international resolutions were among the key points agreed upon between the LF and FPM, Geagea said. As he read the key points of his understanding with Aoun, Geagea paused for a moment to tell joke. With humor, the LF leader asked Aoun to urge his son-in-law Foreign Minister Gebran Bassil to act in accordance with the sixth point of their agreement. Geagea was referring to his understanding with the Former general over "the need to adopt an independent foreign policy that guarantees Lebanon's interests and complies with international law." For his part, Aoun thanked Geagea for his support and said he would extend his hands to all political parties. Geagea's official endorsement of Aoun's nomination would provide a significant boost for the former general's presidential bid but it remains unclear how the Future Movement would react to this initiative.

Before his arrival to the LF's headquarters, Aoun met with Maronite Patriarch BecharaRai, who has repeatedly voiced his support for initiatives aimed at breaking the presidential deadlock. "We came to inform the patriarch of the agreement," Aoun said from the seat of the Maronite church. Earlier in the day, Rai had met with former Prime Minister and head of the Future Movement parliamentary bloc Fouad Siniora. Following his meeting with the patriarch, Siniora stressed the need to elect a president who enjoys the support of all Lebanese factions. "We have to work hard to elect a person who can unite all Lebanese people from all political affiliations and promote coexistence among them," said Siniora.

Geagea's endorsement of Aoun is the first time the country's two leading Christian parties have come together on such a pivotal issue after decades of animosity. Geagea, the former March 14 presidential candidate, was caught by surprise when his ally Future Movement leader and former Prime Minister Saad Hariri reportedly nominated Marada Movement Chief Suleiman Franjieh for the presidency. Geagea has staunchly opposed the deal, which stirred up controversy both within the March 8 and 14 camps. Aoun, on the other hand, had shown no signs of giving up his presidential ambitions in favor of Franjieh, a longtime ally of Hezbollah and a member of Aoun's reform and Change parliamentary bloc.

For weeks Hezbollah remained silent over Hariri's proposed settlement, as Franjieh sought to win the support of its allies. Hezbollah finally broke its media silence Dec. 29, 2015, and reaffirmed its support for Aoun's presidential bid.

In the first official statement since Hariri's initiative emerged, Hezbollah's Politburo Chief Sayyed Ibrahim Amin al-Sayyed announced from the seat of the Maronite patriarchate that his party is committed to supporting the presidential bid of its ally Aoun. Aoun and Geagea kicked off talks a year ago. The talks culminated in a Declaration of Intent that paved the way for a surprise visit by Geagea to Aoun's residence in Rabieh in June. The Declaration of Intent has since brought Aoun and Geagea closer together, putting an end to the bitter rivalry between the Christian leaders who fought a devastating war in 1990.

On 31 October 2016, General Michel Aoun was elected by the Lebanese parliament as Lebanon's president, ending a 29-month presidential vacuum.

2019 FPM internal elections 
On 1 September 2019, Gebran Bassil was re-elected as FPM leader and May Khreich was elected as vice president.

US sanctions on Gebran Bassil 
in November 6, 2020, the US Treasury's Office of Foreign Assets Control (OFAC) sanctioned Gebran Bassil, head of the Free Patriotic Movement, member of the Lebanese Parliament, and son-in-law of Lebanese President Michel Aoun. The penalties are due to its role in corruption in Lebanon according to Magnitsky's Global Human Rights Accountability Law. US Secretary of State Stephen T. Munchen: "Systematic corruption in the Lebanese political system represented by Bassil has helped undermine the foundations of an effective government that serves the Lebanese people. This designation also demonstrates that the United States supports the Lebanese people in their continuous calls for reform and accountability."

Media

OTV 
The Free Patriotic Movement launched its own broadcasting channel, Orange TV (OTV) on 20 July 2007, and their own radio station called Sawt Al Mada (English:Voice of Scope) on 1 June 2009.

Tayyar.org 
Tayyar.org is an online news platform established in 2001 to promote the agenda of its former leader and current President of Lebanon, General Michel Aoun.

Parliamentary elections

2005 elections and rise of the FPM 
At the time of the 2005 elections, the FPM came up with a detailed political program which contained economic and political reform plans and gained the support of many Lebanese Christians. The FPM won 21 seats in the parliament, and formed the second biggest bloc in the Lebanese Parliament. Being the leading Christian bloc after the election, it joined the March 8 Alliance.

2009 elections 

Despite the strong media and political war against the Free Patriotic Movement, the results of the 2009 Elections granted the FPM 27 parliamentary seats. The FPM's bloc is the second largest in the Lebanese parliament. The FPM gained 7 more seats than in  the 2005 elections, earning at least triple the number of deputies of any other Christian-based bloc in the parliament due to geographical distribution. The total seats won by the March 8 alliance were 57 out of 128, which led to a defeat for the FPM.

2018 elections 

The electoral slogan of the party was 'A Strong [FPM] for a Strong Lebanon'. The party formed a number of local coalitions with a wide array alliance partners around the country. In North III FPM fielded the "Strong North" list, headed by Gebran Bassil, in alliance with the Independence Movement and the Future Movement. In Mount Lebanon I (Byblos–Kesrwan) FPM fielded the "Strong Lebanon" list led by Chamel Roukoz. In Mount Lebanon II (Metn) FPM fielded the "Strong Metn" list together with the SSNP and Tashnaq.

After the split between the Future Movement and the Lebanese Forces, a joint list for Beirut I of the Free Patriotic Movement, Tashnaq and the Hunchaks was conceived supported by the Future Movement. In Bekaa I FPM, Future, Tashnaq and independents fielded a joint list. In North I (Akkar) and South II (Saida-Jezzine) FPM formed electoral alliances with al-Jamaat al-Islamiyya. In North II FPM fielded a list in alliance with Kamal Kheir. Moreover, whilst FPM and the Amal-Hezbollah coalition parted ways nationally, joint lists were presented in Beirut II, Mount Lebanon III (Baabda), and Bekaa II (West Bekaa-Rachaya).

In Bekaa III (Baalbek-Hermel) FPM had hoped to form a list together with former speaker Hussein el-Husseini, but the project fell apart as el-Husseini withdrew from the electoral process. In the end, the Free Patriotic Movement candidates joined the list led by the former regional secretary of the Baath Party, Faiz Shukr.

In South III the Future Movement, the Free Patriotic Movement and the Lebanese Democratic Party supported a joint list called "The South is Worth It", with two FPM-supported independents.

Following the announcement of results, Gebran Bassil stated that FPM and its Strong Lebanon bloc would form the largest bloc in parliament (a role previously played by the Future Movement). Bassil stated that FPM would gather up to 30 MPs, including Talal Arslan and Tashnaqs.

2022 elections 

Free Patriotic Movement lost seats in the 15 May 2022 elections. The Free Patriotic Movement, was no longer the biggest Christian party in the parliament after the election. The Lebanese Forces became the largest Christian party in Parliament.

Election summary

References

External links

2005 establishments in Lebanon
Christian democratic parties in Asia
Christian political parties in Lebanon
Lebanese nationalist parties
March 8 Alliance
Michel Aoun
Political parties established in 2005
Political parties in Lebanon